Puel is a French surname. It may refer to:

Claude Puel (born 1961), French football manager and former player
Grégoire Puel (born 1992), French footballer
Paulin Puel (born 1997), French footballer
Timothée Puel (1812–1890), French physician and botanist

French-language surnames